The Association of Catholic Trade Unionists (ACTU) was a labor organization associated with Catholic Worker newspaper (founded in 1933 by Dorothy Day and Peter Maurin).

History
The Association of Catholic Trade Unionists, or ACTU, formed in founded in February 1937.

The ACTU encouraged Pope Pius XI's March 1937 anti-communist encyclical Divini Redemptoris and promoted mainstream Catholic teachings in the United States labor movement.  It served as a hub for Catholics who opposed the growing influence of communists and other radical trade union organizers affiliated with the Communist Party USA. While not a union itself, the ACTU sought to "educate, stimulate, and coordinate on a Christian basis the action of the Catholic workingmen and women in the American labor movement."  

The ACTU played an important role in opposing left-wings in a number of unions.  Such unions including the United Electrical, Radio and Machine Workers of America (UE) and Transport Workers Union of America (TWUA). It played a particularly important role in building the International Union of Electrical Workers, which split from UE. In late 1939, the ACTU described the Congress of Industrial Organizations (CIO) as a "breeding nest of American Communism." 

Following World War II, the ACTU declined and eventually dissolved in the late 1960s.

Notable members
 John C. Cort
 John F. Henning
 Charles Owen Rice
 Paul Weber (unionist)

References

1937 establishments in New York (state)
1960s disestablishments in the United States
Anti-communist organizations in the United States
Catholic trade unions